is a railway station in Itoshima, Fukuoka Prefecture, Japan. It is operated by JR Kyushu and is on the Chikuhi Line.

Lines
Only local services on the Chikuhi Line stop at this station.

Station layout 
The station consists of two side platforms serving two tracks. There is no station building but shelters are provided on both platforms for waiting passengers. The platforms are linked by a covered footbridge but each platform has its own entrance and  ramp from the access road on its side.

Adjacent stations

History
By 1 April 1924, the line had been extended east to Maebaru (today ). Dainyū was opened on 15 April 1925 as an additional station on the existing track between Fukuyoshi and Maebaru. When the Kitakyushu Railway was nationalized on 1 October 1937, Japanese Government Railways (JGR) took over control of the station and designated the line which served it as the Chikuhi Line. With the privatization of Japanese National Railways (JNR), the successor of JGR, on 1 April 1987, control of the station passed to JR Kyushu.

Passenger statistics
In fiscal 2012, there were a daily average of 140 passengers (boarding only) using the station.

Environs
National Route 202
Dainyū Beach
Dainyū Fishing Port

See also
 List of railway stations in Japan

References

External links
Dainyū Station (JR Kyushu)

Railway stations in Japan opened in 1925
Chikuhi Line
Railway stations in Fukuoka Prefecture
Stations of Kyushu Railway Company